The first season of The Mask Singer Myanmar premiered on 15 November 2019, and lasted for 16 episodes. On 28 February 2020, the  Peacock (singer Sin Pauk) was declared the winner, and the Pineapple (singer Lain Maw Thee) the runner-up.

Season overview
Key: 
 Eliminated
 Saved
 ABC or DEF winner
 second place
 Overall Winner

References

Burmese television series
Musical game shows
Masked Singer